Dobwalls Adventure Park was a family-run visitor attraction in the village of Dobwalls, near Liskeard, Cornwall. Founded in 1970 by John Southern, the park was one of Cornwall's top visitor attractions, consisting of two miniature railway networks complemented by large play areas and recreational grounds, both indoors and outdoors, an award-winning art gallery and woodland walks.

The park closed at the end of the 2006 season for redevelopment work, but in June 2007 it was announced that it would not reopen in its original form as an adventure park. The redevelopment projects stalled, with the John Southern Gallery and new camping site closing. The administrators were called in and the site, complete with many of the original buildings and landscapes still in existence were put up for sale by sealed bid auction.

Miniature railway networks 

The main attractions in the park were the  gauge miniature railway networks that were based on two very different American railroad routes, the Rio Grande Cumbres Pass line and the Sherman Hill route of the Union Pacific Railroad; passengers were whisked through tunnels, over bridges and trestles and into canyons.

The Rio Grande line was opened in 1970 and included a 1:25 (4%) gradient, the steepest climb on a passenger-carrying miniature railway. The line wove in and out of a forest, recreating the Colorado railroads.

The Union Pacific route was opened in 1979, due to the success of the Rio Grande system, and added another miniature railway network to travel on. It was modelled closely on the real Union Pacific Sherman Hill line in Wyoming and had a ruling gradient of 1:66 (1.51%), a very steep hill for a  railway.

In October 2006 it was announced that after over 25 years in operation, the Union Pacific railroad was to close. The last train ran on 29 October 2006. June 2007 saw the announcement that the remaining Rio Grande route would not reopen for the 2008 season, and would be replaced by a shorter simplified line.

Locomotives 
The locomotives were as follows:

When the park closed in 2006 all the locomotives were made available for sale, and in early 2008 eight of them were sold to a gentleman in Dorset to run at Plowman's Railroad near Ferndown in Dorset. The Dorset railway is no longer running and the locomotives have since been exported to Australia as part of a private project to build a seven and a quarter inch railroad next to the 'Puffing Billy Railway' in Australia.

As an update, the seven-and-a-quarter railway will not be built. The local council has denied it.

Redevelopment work 
The park was closed for major redevelopment including the construction of new holiday lodges, a new arts centre and various other adjustments designed to boost income to the park at a time when many theme parks are feeling increasing competition and falling profits. The Go Kart track was due be demolished, and some of the play equipment removed. The Southern Gallery was due to remain until its new home is completed.  Since then the land was available for sale in 2012.

See also 

 Ridable miniature railway
 Diamond Valley Railway

References

External links 

Tourist attractions in Cornwall
Defunct amusement parks in England
Miniature railways in the United Kingdom
1970 establishments in England
2006 disestablishments in England
Defunct amusement parks in the United Kingdom
7¼ in gauge railways in England